The numbered roads in the Regional Municipality of Durham account for about  of the county road system in the Canadian province of Ontario. The Durham Region Works Department owns and maintains the regional roads and regional highways, while the Ministry of Transportation of Ontario (MTO) owns and maintains the King's Highways in the region. The 67 (7 King's Highways, 4 Regional Highways, and 56 Regional Roads) numbered roads provide access to the entirety of the region. Highway 401 forms the backbone of the region, traveling from the western boundary of the region to the eastern boundary alongside Lake Ontario, and serving over 200,000 vehicles per day. Several provincially maintained highways existed in the region prior to 1998, when they were transferred to municipal government in the region as part of a province-wide downloading of highways. Where the regional tier of municipal government has since been responsible for these routes, they have been designated as Durham Regional Highways.

Network 

The road network of the Regional Municipality of Durham consists of 832 kilometres (2,087 lane kilometres) of arterial roadway. There are 60 numbered roads, referred to mostly as Regional Roads, though four former King's Highways are referred to as Regional Highways, where they are now owned and maintained by the region.

In addition to the roads, there are 209 bridge and culvert structures currently maintained by the region. The region is not responsible for the bridges over and under Highway 401, Highway 407 and Highway 412 nor the bridges over and under Highway 35/115 or, all of which are maintained by the MTO. The region is also exempt from the construction and maintenance of bridges crossed by railway, but not from bridges which separate road and rail crossings.

History 
The regional municipality of Durham was created in 1974 by the merger of portions of Durham and Ontario counties.

Structures 
The Regional Municipality of Durham is responsible for the maintenance of both pavement as well as many structures that are over, under, or near the pavement. Bridges, culverts, and traffic signals are all built and maintained by the Works Department.

Services 

The Durham Regional Police Service Traffic Enforcement unit handles enforcement of traffic laws, except on the King's Highways, which are patrolled by the Ontario Provincial Police. Speed limits on regional roads vary between 50 and 80 kilometres per hour. Police in Durham will generally not set speed traps, as the region encourages the safe flow of traffic, and punishes unsafe driving rather than speed limits. Maintenance and snow clearing is performed by the Durham Works Department. Five depots operate throughout the region in addition to the traffic operations centre in Whitby.

Numbered roads

Regional Highways

Regional Roads

~

Notes

References

Route maps 

Roads in the Regional Municipality of Durham